Martin Wildauer (born 27 November 1987) is an Austrian strongman competitor and entrant to the World's Strongest Man competition. He is a competitor of the well-known Strongman Champions League and the Giants Live competitions. Martin is the current world record holder in the bavarian stonelift.

Biography
Martin was born in Kufstein, Tirol in Austria on 27 November 1987. He was a sports enthusiast even as a child and at the age of 10 started kickboxing. After winning some national competitions in Austria after two years he began boxing but due to school commitments he found he did not have the time to commit to boxing. With the time he did have he began weight training and although his parents tried to encourage this further by buying him weights at home he found that the best environment for his progress was the gym.

A meeting with a powerlifter introduced him to deadlifting and squatting and by the age of 15 he was deadlifting 200 kg. He began to compete at the age of 16 years and soon began to set records, thus far having set over 40 new national records. He moved into strength athletics at nineteen, winning his first competition, a qualifier for the Austrian nationals. He then placed 5th at the Austrian nationals, improving this to third the following year. In the same year he won the Austrian Winter Giants competition. In 2009 a second place at the Strongman Fibo classic, behind Travis Ortmayer, qualified him for the Strongman Champions League. At his inaugural outing in the league in Serbia, he won the car deadlift and came 5th overall. He went on to compete at the next Champions league meeting in Finland, where he set a new official world record in the car deadlift and came 3rd overall. This in turn got him an invite to the pinnacle of strongman, World's Strongest Man. In what was deemed the "group of death" which also contained Žydrūnas Savickas and Brian Shaw, he did not manage to qualify for the final. In 2009 he won the Austria's Strongest Man title.

Martin recently won the 2010 Austrian Giants contest on 18 December 2010.

He is trained by the renowned German strongman Heinz Ollesch.

Personal Records
Bench press : Raw 210 kg – equipped 250 kg
Squat : Raw 300 kg, – equipped 380 kg
Deadlift : Raw 420 kg – equipped 435 kg

Competition Record
 2004
 1.  – Austrian Nationals Powerlifting
 3.  – Tyrol Competition Powerlifting Open
 3.  – Bavaria Cup – Deadlift
 2005
 1.  – Austrian Nationals Powerlifting Juniors
 2.  – Bavaria Cup – Deadlift
 2.  – Austrian Nationals Powerlifting Open
 3.  – Tyrol Competition Powerlifting Open
 2.  – Tyrol Competition Powerlifting – Bench Press Open
 2006
 3.  – Tyrol Competition Powerlifting Open
 1.  – Golden Barbell Classic in Austria
 2.  – Bavarian Stonelift in Bonbruck, Germany
 2.  – International Bavarian Stonelift in Feldkirchen, Germany
 2.  – Bavarian Stonelift in Bonbruck, Germany
 2007
 1.  – MoosBummerl-Cup Bavarian Stonelift, Germany
 1.  – Bavaria Cup – Deadlift
 1.  – CWA 4-Country Competition in Graz, Austria
 8.  – IFSA Team WM, Ukraine
 1.  – Austria's Strongest Man (Austrian Summer Giants – Qualification)
 5.  – Austria's Strongest Man (Austrian Summer Giants)
 1.  – International Bavarian Stonelift in Feldkirchen, Germany
 2008
 1.  – Austrian Winter Giants
 1.  – Austrian Records Day in Obertrum
 4.  – IFSA Team WM, Ukraine
 2.  – International Competition in Serbia
 2.  – CWA 4-Country Competition in Graz, Austria
 1.  – International Bavarian Stonelift in Feldkirchen, Germany
 1.  – Austria's Strongest Man (Austrian Summer Giants – Qualification)
 3.  – Austria's Strongest Man (Austrian Summer Giants)
 2.  – Day of Power in Fohnsdorf in Austria
 2.  – Tyrol Competition Powerlifting Open
 2.  – Team Competition Austria vs. Poland
 2009
 2.  – Strongman Fibo classic
 5.  – Strongman Champions League 2009: Subotica
 3.  – Strongman Champions League 2009: Ideapark
 1.  – Bavarian Stonelift HebAuf, Germany
 1.  – Bavarian Stonelift Klosterlechfeld, Germany
 8.  – Strongman Champions League 2009: Slovakia
 1.  – Austria's Strongest Man (Austrian Summer Giants)
 1.  – International Competition in Salzburg, Austria
 1.  – Eisenstrassen Giants, Austria
 Q.  – 2009 World's Strongest Man
 4.  – Strongman Champions League 2009: Spain
 9.  – Strongman Champions League 2009: London
 2010
 1.  – Bavarian Stonelift – Löwenbräukeller in Munich
 5.  – Strongman Champions League 2010: FIBO Strongman Classic – Germany
 6.  – Strongman Champions League 2010: Slovakia
 1.  – Austrian Winter Giants
 2011
 10.  – Strongman Champions League 2011: Lapland-Iceman
 2.  – Austria's King of Overhead
 3.  – Strongman Champions League 2011: FIBO Strongman Classic – Germany
 4.  – Strongman Champions League 2011: Serbia
 10.  – Strongman Champions League 2011: Holland
 1.  – Bavarian Stonelift in Grafing, Germany
 1.  – Austria's Strongest Man (Austrian Summer Giants)
 1.  – Giants Live 2011: Giants Live Finland
 Q.  – 2011 World's Strongest Man
 1.  – Austrian Winter Giants
 2012
 6.  – Strongman Champions League 2011: Sarajevo-Final of 2011
 7.  – Strongman Champions League 2012: ICEMAN in Finland
 1.  – Bavarian Stonelift – Löwenbräukeller in Munich
 4.  – Strongman Champions League 2012: Fibo Germany
 6.  – Strongman Champions League 2012: Serbia
 1.  – Austria's Strongest Man (Austrian Summer Giants)
 injured  – Strongman Champions League 2012: Holland
 injured  – Strongman Champions League 2012: Finland
 7.  – Strongman Champions League 2012: Poland
 1.  – International Competition in Salzburg, Austria
 Q.  – 2012 World's Strongest Man
 2013
 1.  – Bavarian Stonelift – Löwenbräukeller in Munich
 7.  – Strongman Champions League 2013: FIBO Germany
 2.  – Strongman Champions League 2013: Serbia
 9.  – Strongman Champions League 2013: Latvia
 8.  – Strongman Champions League 2013: Czech Republic
 1.  – Austria's Strongest Man (Austrian Summer Giants)
 1.  – International Germany-Cup – Weko-Cup in Germany
 1.  – Bavarian Stonelift – Garmisch-Partenkirchen
 6.  – Giants Live Poland
 Q.  – 2013 World's Strongest Man
 1.  – Eisenstrassen Giants Team Competition, Austria
 3.  – Strongman Champions League 2013: Slowakia
 5.  – Strongman Champions League 2013: Poland
 2014
 12.  – 2014 World's Strongest Man
 2.  – Strongman Champions League 2014: FIBO Germany
 1.  – Bavarian Stonelift – Löwenbräukeller in Munich
 2.  – International King of Overhead
 1.  – Eisenhart 2014 – Best Deadlifter 400 kg raw
 3.  – Strongman Champions League 2014: Serbia
 4.  – Strongman Champions League 2014: Finland
 9.  – Strongman Champions League 2014: Holland
 3.  – Strongman Champions League 2014: Latvia
 1.  – Strongman Champions League 2014: Portugal
 2.  – Strongman Champions League 2014: Croatia
 2.  – Strongman Champions League 2014: Poland
 3.  – World Deadlift Championship in Leeds – 435kg
 6.  – Europe's Strongest Man in Leeds
 1.  – Austria's Strongest Man in Obertrum, Austria
 4.  – Strongman Champions League 2014: Hungary
 1.  – Eisenstrassen Giants Team Competition, Austria
 6.  – Strongman Champions League 2014: Sambia
 3  – Strongman Champions League 2014: Romania
 4  – Strongman Champions League 2014: Savickas Classic Lithuania
 2  – Strongman Champions League 2014: Estonia
 1. – WORLDCHAMPION SCL 2014

References

External links
 Martin Wildauer – official site

Austrian strength athletes
1987 births
Living people
People from Kufstein
Austrian powerlifters
Sportspeople from Tyrol (state)